Under the Black Ensign is a Caribbean pirate adventure story written by L. Ron Hubbard and set in 1680 AD. It was first published in the August 1935 issue of Five Novels Monthly magazine.

When the ship is overtaken by pirates, Bristol is marooned on an island, where he begins his quest for revenge and starts his career as a Caribbean pirate.

Under the Black Ensign is republished in the Galaxy Press Golden Age series, started in 2008. The book has been re-released as a trade paperback, with French flaps, glossaries, and author biography. It is also available as a full-cast audiobook featuring Lori Jablons, R.F. Daley, Shane Johnson, Jim Meskimen and Tait Ruppert, and directed by Jim Meskimen.

Sources 

1935 American novels
American adventure novels
Novels by L. Ron Hubbard
Fiction set in 1680
Novels about pirates